Ida Maria Christina Lindh (born 29 September 1993) is a retired Swedish ice hockey forward.

International career
Lindh was selected for the Sweden women's national ice hockey team in the 2014 Winter Olympics. She played in all six games, recording two assists.

Lindh made one appearance for the Sweden women's national under-18 ice hockey team, at the IIHF World Women's U18 Championships in 2011.

Career statistics

Club statistics  
Note: Riksserien changed its name to the SDHL in 2016.

International 
Through 2013–14 season

References

External links

Sports-Reference Profile

1993 births
Living people
Ice hockey players at the 2014 Winter Olympics
Ice hockey players at the 2018 Winter Olympics
Olympic ice hockey players of Sweden
Ice hockey people from Stockholm
Swedish women's ice hockey forwards
Minnesota Duluth Bulldogs women's ice hockey players
Swedish expatriate ice hockey players in the United States
Djurgårdens IF Hockey Dam players